This is a list of women's Commonwealth Games medallists in swimming from 1930 to 2022.

Current program

50 metre freestyle

100 metre freestyle

200 metre freestyle

400 metre freestyle

800 metre freestyle

50 metre backstroke

100 metre backstroke

200 metre backstroke

50 metre breaststroke

100 metre breaststroke

200 metre breaststroke

50 metre butterfly

100 metre butterfly

200 metre butterfly

200 metre individual medley

400 metre individual medley

4×100 metre freestyle relay

4×200 metre freestyle relay

4×100 metre medley relay

Para swimming events

50 metre freestyle S8

50 metre freestyle S9

50 metre freestyle S13

100 metre freestyle S8

100 metre freestyle S9

200 metre freestyle S14

100 metre backstroke S8

100 metre backstroke S9

100 metre breaststroke SB6

100 metre breaststroke SB9

50 metre butterfly S7

100 metre butterfly S9

200 metre individual medley SM10

Discontinued events

100 yard freestyle

110 yard freestyle

400 yard freestyle

440 yard freestyle

100 yard backstroke

110 yard backstroke

220 yard backstroke

110 yard breaststroke

200 yard breaststroke

220 yard breaststroke

110 yard butterfly

220 yard butterfly

440 yard individual medley

4×100 yard freestyle relay

4x110 yard freestyle relay

3×110 yard medley relay

4 x110 yard medley relay

See also
 List of Commonwealth Games medallists in swimming (men)

References
Results Database from the Commonwealth Games Federation

medallists
Lists of swimming medalists

Commonwealth Games